Sinagoga Shaare Sedek is an Orthodox synagogue in Barranquilla, Colombia. It was established by Sephardic Jewish immigrants in the beginning of the 20th century.

References 
  

Orthodox synagogues
Sephardi Jewish culture in Colombia
Sephardi synagogues
Synagogues in Colombia
Buildings and structures in Barranquilla
Orthodox Judaism in South America